The gens Bucculeia was a Roman family during the late Republic.  It is known chiefly from a single individual, Marcus Bucculeius, a legal scholar, mentioned in a humorous anecdote of Cicero, and attributed by him to the orator Lucius Licinius Crassus.

See also
 List of Roman gentes

References

Roman gentes